Tetracis crocallata is a moth of the family Geometridae first described by Achille Guenée in 1858. It is found in North America from Nova Scotia, New Brunswick, southern Manitoba and southern Saskatchewan to Alberta, south to northern Florida, west to Kansas, Nebraska, North Dakota and extreme eastern Texas.

The length of the forewings 17–25 mm. Adults are on wing from May to August depending on the location. There are two generations in New York and southward.

The larvae feed on Alnus, Castanea and Salix species.

References

Moths described in 1858
Tetracis